Inhumate are a French deathgrind band. They started off as a death metal band in 1990 but with a line up change in 1993 where Stephane and Olivier left the band and were replaced by Valentin and Sebastien, the band's  musical stile shifted towards grindcore.

In their career they have played concerts with such band as Agathocles, Cannibal Corpse, Cryptopsy, Immolation, Sepultura, Malignant Tumour, Nile, Six Feet Under, Unholy Grave and Vader, in a total of 9 different European countries (France, Belgium, Netherlands, Switzerland, Poland, Germany, Italy, Austria and Czech Republic).

History 
The band was formed in September 1990 by bassist Fred, who went to Strasbourg looking for musicians with whom he could form a death metal band. He quickly found Olivier (vocals), Stéphane (drums) and David (guitar), and the band formed under the name Inhumate.

After a year, Stéphanie and Olivier left the band and were replaced by Valentin (drums) and Sébastien (vocals). With this line-up, the band became more grindcore-orientated and recorded its first demo, Abstract Suffering, in 1993. In 1994, Valentin and Sébastien left the group and were replaced by Yannick (drums) and Christophe (vocals).

This line-up remained stable and more focused on grind. In May 1995, they recorded their second demo, Grind Your Soul. In the following years, they released four studio albums: Internal Life (September 1996), Ex-Pulsion (November 1997), Growth (June 2000) and Life (February 2004).

In October 2006, the band's guitarist, David, left the group and was replaced by Damien, 2 years and half later Inhumate released its fifth full-length album The Fifth Season (April 2009)

Members 
Fred – bass (1990–present)
Yannick – drums (1994–present)
Christophe – vocals (1994–present)
Damien – guitar, vocals (2006–present)

Former members 
Stephane – drums (1990–1991)
David – guitar, vocals (1990–2006)
Oliver – vocals (1990–1991)
Valentin – drums (1991–1994)
Sebastien – vocals (1991–1994)

Discography 
1993 – Abstract Suffering (demo tape)
1995 – Grind Your Soul (demo tape)
1996 – Internal Life
1997 – Ex-Pulsion
2000 – Growth
2004 – Life
2007 – At War with... Inhumate (DVD)
2009 – The Fifth Season
2013 – Expulsed
2021 – Eternal Life

Splits 
 Split tape with Funeral March (1996)
 Split tape with  Exhumator (1998)
 Split tape with  Disembowel (1998)
 Split tape with  Trauma Team (1998)
 Split tape with  Maggot Shoes (1999)
 Split tape with  Sanguinary (1999)
 Split 7" with  Alienation Mental (2000)
 Split 7" with  Vaginal Incest : Fetus Included (2003)
 Split 7" with  Depression (2008)

References

External links 
 Official Band Website
 Official Bandcamp
 Inhumate on Reverbnation

Musical groups established in 1990
French death metal musical groups
Musical quartets